Nova N 176 is an undeciphered manuscript codex held at the Institute of Oriental Manuscripts (IOM) of the Russian Academy of Sciences in Saint Petersburg, Russia.  The manuscript, of uncertain provenance, entered the collection of the IOM in 1954, and for more than fifty years nobody was able to identify with certainty what language or script the text of the manuscript was written in.  It was only in 2010 that IOM researcher Viacheslav Zaytsev was able to demonstrate that the manuscript is written in the Khitan large script, one of two largely undeciphered writing systems used for the now-extinct Khitan language during the 10th–12th centuries by the Khitan people, who founded the Liao Empire in north-eastern China.

Description
The manuscript is stored in the Nova fonds of Chinese manuscripts in the IOM (call number N 176, inventory number 1055), and comprises nine quires sewn together, one loose quire, and seven loose folios, in total 63½ folios (127 leaves), together with a piece of cloth cover with Khitan characters on it. The codex is enclosed in a brown leather binding of an Islamic type, which may or may not be the original binding.

 Quire 1: 6 folios (leaves 1–12).
 Quire 2: 6 folios (leaves 13–24).
 Quire 3: 6 folios (leaves 25–36).
 Quire 4: 5 folios (leaves  37–46).
 Quire 5: 6 folios (leaves 47–58).
 Quire 6: 6 folios (leaves 59–70).
 Quire 7: 5 folios (leaves  71–80).
 Quire 8: 6 folios (leaves 81–92).
 Quire 9: 6 folios (leaves 93–104).
 Loose quire: 4½ folios (leaves 105–113).  Missing one leaf between leaves 112 and 113.
 7 loose folios (14 leaves, separately numbered).

Each page of the manuscript has six ruled columns of text, each column comprising between 17 and 26 characters written in ink in cursive handwriting.  Most of the manuscript appears to be written in a single hand.

History
The earliest known location for the manuscript was the Institute of Language, Literature and History of the Kyrgyz Branch of the Soviet Academy of Sciences.  At some unknown date (1954 or earlier) the manuscript was sent from the institute in Kyrgyzstan to the Institute of Oriental Studies (IOS) in Moscow for identification and decipherment, and in November 1954, it was sent from Moscow to the Department of Oriental Manuscripts of the IOS (later the Institute of Oriental Manuscripts) in Leningrad, where it has remained ever since.

It is unknown where exactly the manuscript was found, but Kyrgyzstan is within the area of the Kara-Khitan Khanate (also known as the Western Liao), founded by Khitans after the overthrow of the Liao Empire by the Jurchens, and so Zaytsev suggests that the book probably came from a Western Liao site.  Furthermore, as the Khitan script was still used by the Kara-Khitans the book may have been written during the Western Liao (1124–1218) period rather than being a relic of the Liao dynasty brought west with the fleeing Khitans.  Zaytsev notes the possibility that the book may have been discovered during excavations of the Silk Road city of Suyab (modern day Ak-Beshim in Kyrgyzstan) during 1953–1954.

The manuscript was catalogued in the IOM collection as a manuscript written in the Jurchen language, and the general consensus of those few scholars who were able to examine it was that it was probably written in the Jurchen script.  Despite the probable importance of this manuscript, no research on it was published until 2010, when Zaytsev presented his initial findings on the language and script of the manuscript to the annual scientific session of the IOM.

Content
In 2015 Zaytsev proposed that the manuscript comprises eight texts by multiple scribes, the largest of which is an historical text calling itself a “record of Khagans of the Great Central *hulʤi Khitan State.” He identifies this with a lost Liao text mentioned in Chinese records. At present the manuscript is mostly undeciphered and the content of the other texts is unknown. There are significant differences in vocabulary between the manuscript and known memorial inscriptions.

Decipherment
Reading the manuscript is a great challenge, as not only is the Khitan large script largely undeciphered, but the manuscript text is written in a previously unattested cursive style of writing which makes it difficult to match the characters as written in the manuscript with the forms of characters as written on monumental inscriptions.  To date, only some individual Khitan characters (e.g. "state" and "emperor") and two short stretches of text that correspond to text found on monumental inscriptions in the Khitan large script have been identified and read.  Zaytsev identified eight characters at the end of the 5th column of leaf 9 as meaning the date "Chongxi 14th year 2nd month", and seven characters at the start of the 6th column of the same leaf as meaning "Great Central [?] Khitan State".  The characters meaning "Great Central [?] Khitan State" are exactly the same as the first seven characters on the Memorial for the Princess of Yongning Commandery (Chinese 永寧郡公主), dated 1087.  The era name Chongxi is attested on various Khitan large script memorial stones, and the 14th year of the Chongxi era is the 15th year of the reign of Emperor Xingzong of Liao, corresponding to the year 1045, indicating the manuscript cannot have been written any earlier than 1045.

Significance
A relatively large number of memorial inscriptions written in both the Khitan large script and the Khitan small script are known, but there are no surviving printed books in either Khitan script, and no Chinese glossaries of the Khitan language.  Until recently, the only known examples of Khitan text not inscribed on stone or portable artefacts were five Khitan large script characters recorded by Wang Yi 王易, who was sent as an envoy to the Khitans in 1058, and which are reproduced in a mid 14th century book on calligraphy written by Tao Zongyi 陶宗儀.  In 2002 a small fragment of a Khitan manuscript with seven Khitan large characters and interlinear glosses in Old Uyghur was identified in the collection of the Berlin-Brandenburg Academy of Sciences and Humanities. Nova N 176 is therefore the only known example of a full-length manuscript text written in the Khitan language (in either of the two Khitan scripts) to have survived to the present day.

Not only is this the only complete Khitan manuscript text to have been discovered, but it is by far the longest example of any text written in the Khitan large script; indeed, its estimated length of approximately 15,000 characters (20 characters × 6 columns × 127 pages) is equivalent to that of the entire corpus of known monumental inscriptions written in the Khitan large script (given as 15,000 characters by Wu & Janhunen).

See also
 List of Khitan inscriptions

Notes

Footnotes

References

External links
  Article on the manuscript by V. P. Zaytsev

Archaeology of Kyrgyzstan
Central Asian manuscripts
Institute of Oriental Manuscripts of the Russian Academy of Sciences
Khitan language manuscripts
Manuscripts written in undeciphered writing systems